The German-language surname Osten may refer to:

Franz Osten, German filmmaker
Maria Osten, German and Soviet journalist
Cathy Osten
Suzanne Osten
Manfred Osten
Cornelius Osten
Ariel Gerardo Nahuelpan Osten

The noble surname von der Osten may refer to:
von der Osten (noble family)
Adolph Sigfried von der Osten
Anton von Prokesch-Osten
Eva von der Osten
Hans von Tschammer und Osten
Hans-Georg von der Osten (1895-1987), German flying ace
Vali von der Osten
Lina Heydrich, born Lina Mathilde von Osten

See also
van Osten
van Oosten
Osten-Sacken

German-language surnames
Military families of Germany